Miss Earth 2021 was the 21st edition of the Miss Earth pageant, held virtually on November 21, 2021 due to the ongoing COVID-19 pandemic.

At the end of the event, Lindsey Coffey of the United States crowned Destiny Wagner of Belize as Miss Earth 2021. This is the first time Belize won the Miss Earth pageant, and any of the Big Four international beauty pageants. In the same event, other elemental winners were also crowned: Marisa Butler of the United States won Miss Earth – Air, Romina Denecken of Chile as Miss Earth – Water, and Jareerat Petsom of Thailand as Miss Earth – Fire.

Contestants from 80 countries and territories participated in this year's pageant. The pageant was hosted by James Deakin for the fifth consecutive time, and Miss Earth 2017 Karen Ibasco.

Background

Location and date 
For the second consecutive time, the pageant was held virtually. This is due to the rise of the COVID-19 cases in the Philippines brought by the Delta variant. According to Lorraine Schuck, executive vice-president of Carousel Productions, "The safety of all delegates, production staff, and the general public remains paramount to the organization and will, in no way, put anyone involved in the event at risk." It was confirmed that the pageant will be on November 21, 2021.

Selection of participants 
Contestants from 80 countries and territories were selected to compete in the competition. A delegate was appointed to her position after being a runner-up of their national pageant or being selected through a casting process, while four were selected to replace the original dethroned winner.

Enya Rock, the first runner-up of Miss Earth Austria 2021, was appointed to represent Austria after Klaudia Bleimer, the original Miss Earth Austria 2021, could not fulfill her duties due to her obligations as a nurse. However, Bleimer was given the Miss Earth Air Austria title. Destiny Wagner was appointed to represent Belize after Aarti Sooknandan, Miss Earth Belize 2021, asked to be withdrawn from competing at the pageant. Alice Li was appointed to represent Canada after Laura Pastor, Miss Earth Canada 2021, said that she would fit better to be in a live pageant than virtual. Anastasia Almyasheva was appointed to represent Russia after Miss Earth Russia Albina Koroleva withdrew due to undisclosed reasons.

The 2021 edition saw the debuts of Gambia, Iran, and Laos, and the return of Angola, Belize, Botswana, Bulgaria, Crimea, Cuba, the Czech Republic, England, Kyrgyzstan, Latvia, Malaysia, Nepal, North Macedonia, Rwanda, and Ukraine. Bulgaria last competed in 2004, North Macedonia last competed in 2006 as Macedonia, Latvia last competed in 2014, Angola and Kyrgyzstan last competed in 2017, Belize and Cuba last competed in 2018, while the others last competed in 2019. Burkina Faso, Costa Rica, Ecuador, Finland, Germany, Guyana, Iceland, Jamaica, Moldova, Mongolia, Pakistan, Poland, Romania, Sierra Leone, Uruguay, the US Virgin Islands, and Zambia withdrew after their respective organizations failed to hold a national competition or appoint a delegate.

Nine contestants from the original 89 contestants were absent from the final night after competing in the preliminary competitions. They are Lune Aminata Coulibaly of Côte d'Ivoire, Ana Brajčić of Croatia, Tamnica Kedir Zeynu of Ethiopia, Jissel Rivera of Honduras, Sima Mohamed of Iraq, Odella Flomo of Liberia, Miriam Abdou Saleye of Niger, Jelena Vukcevic of Switzerland, and Chilekwa Kalunga of Zambia.

Results

Colors key
 Miss Earth
 Miss Earth – Air
 Miss Earth – Water
 Miss Earth – Fire
 Top 8
 Top 20

Placements

Pre-pageant activities

Medalists

Judges 
 Amel Rose – International popstar, singer and songwriter.
 Allan Wu – actor and host of The Amazing Race Asia and The Amazing Race China.
 Davonna Finley – women's advocate, pageant analyst and social media's The Sovereign.
 Atty. Roel Refran – seasoned lawyer, capital markets executive and an educator in law and business.
Adrienne Janic – TV host, model and actress, also known as "AJ" from the hit TV show Overhaul.
Desmound Majekodunmi – Radio Host, Musician, Documentary Producer, Farmer and a Creation Care Environmentalist.
 Lorraine Schuck – Former Miss Asia Quest 1979 1st runner-up & Executive Vice President, Carousel Productions.

Contestants
80 contestants competed for the title.

Notes

References

External links
 

2021
2021 beauty pageants
Events affected by the COVID-19 pandemic
Impact of the COVID-19 pandemic on television